Zhang Jingyi may refer to:
 Zhang Jingyi (footballer)
 Zhang Jingyi (actress)